Bikiran Prasad Barua is a Bangladeshi physicist and educationist. He is the former chairman of the physics department of the University of Chittagong. In recognition of his contribution in education, the government of Bangladesh awarded him the country's second highest civilian award Ekushey Padak in 2020.

Barua was born in Chittagong. He is the President of the Bangabandhu Education and Research Council in the Greater Chittagong area. He published 17  research papers on physics.

References 

Living people
Bangladeshi physicists
Bangladeshi Buddhists
University of Chittagong people
Recipients of the Ekushey Padak
Date of birth missing (living people)
Year of birth missing (living people)